The 1920 Manitoba general election was held on June 29, 1920 to elect members of the Legislative Assembly of the Province of Manitoba, Canada.

The election resulted in a fragmented parliament, with no group holding effective power over the legislature. Norris's Liberals were re-elected. They remained the largest party, but were reduced to a minority government with 21 seats out of 55.

This was the first general election in which women could vote and run for office. Edith Rogers was elected in this election, becoming the first woman elected to the Manitoba Legislature.

This was also the first election where Single Transferable Voting was used to elect the Winnipeg MLAs, now ten in number.

Background

Between the previous 1915 election and the 1920 campaign, Manitoba experienced profound social and cultural change.  Since the formal introduction of partisan politics in 1888, Manitoba had been dominated by the Liberal and Conservative parties, which governed the province in succession.  After World War I, new political groups and interests emerged to threaten the two-party system.

The Winnipeg General Strike of 1919 brought labour issues to the forefront of provincial concern, and radicalized many working-class Manitobans.  In previous elections, labour and socialist parties were a marginal force; going into the 1920 election, they stood to make significant electoral gains.  In the rural constituencies, several candidates ran for office as farmer representatives, or as "people's candidates" opposed to partisan government.

Against this backdrop, the governing Liberal Party of Tobias Norris was forced to run a defensive campaign.  Supported by the Winnipeg Free Press, the Liberals portrayed themselves as a stabilizing force amid the province's changes.

The 1920 election is notable for its use of Single Transferable Voting in the City of Winnipeg. Previously, the city had been divided into three two-member constituencies, each seat elected in a separate First past the post election. 

Starting in the 1920 election, Winnipeg was a single ten-member constituency, where each voter had one vote. The method of election was the single transferable voting (STV) system of proportional representation. In the world, this was the largest number of legislators elected in any district using STV for many years. Winnipeg would use STV to elect its MLAS until 1952.

Outcome

The election resulted in a fragmented parliament, with no group holding effective power over the legislature.  Norris's Liberals remained the largest party, but were reduced to a minority government with 21 seats out of 55.  The party remained in office until 1922, but unwilling or unable to find joint cause with the other factions did little in the way of legislative initiatives.

Twelve "farmer" and "independent farmer" candidates were elected in rural constituencies.  These candidates were a heterogeneous group, and did not run a united campaign.  While not a "political party" in the traditional sense, they formed a functional caucus group in the legislature.  Some members of this group later joined the political wing of the United Farmers of Manitoba, which took power in the next election.

In Winnipeg, Liberal candidates took four seats and Conservatives two but Labour made a good showing there as well. Four different working-class and left-wing parties ran candidates in Winnipeg. 

The Labour Party won an impressive victory in Winnipeg, taking two seats. Party leader Fred Dixon received 1100 votes in the First Count, a lead of more than 7,000 votes ahead of his nearest rival. His vote tally was more than twice the number needed to take a seat (the quota). His surplus were not wasted but under the rules of  STV, they were transferred to other candidates. Many went to other DLP candidates, and Ivens then exceeded quota and was declared elected.

Leftists were rewarded with four seats of the 10 Winnipeg seats. Elected were Dixon and William Ivens of the Dominion Labour Party, George Armstrong of the Socialist Party of Canada, and John Queen of the Social Democratic Party.  SPC's Robert B. Russell narrowly failed to win a second seat for his party.  A candidate of the Ex-Soldiers and Ex-Sailors Party of Manitoba also campaigned with the labour candidates in Winnipeg. When he was eliminated, his votes went mostly to the remaining candidates of the DLP, SPC and SDP.

Ivens, Armstrong, Queen and Russell were all serving prison sentences at the time of the election, due to their leadership of the Winnipeg General Strike.  Many Winnipeg-ers believed the prison sentences were politically motivated, and the issue was a rallying cry for labour in the campaign.

Seven other labour MLAs were elected in the rest of the province, making the Labour group the third largest in the legislature.

The Conservative Party managed a minor recovery from its disastrous showing in 1915, winning eight seats under new leader Richard G. Willis.  Willis himself was not elected.

Three independents were also elected to the legislature in rural districts.

The first woman was elected to the Legislature in this election. Edith Rogers was also the first Indigenous woman in the Manitoba Legislature.

Party results

Note:

(1) SDP popular vote included in "Independents/others".

Riding results

Arthur:
(incumbent) John Williams (L) 891
Duncan Lloyd McLeod (C-Farmer) 881

Assiniboia:
William Bayley (DLP/Lab) 2054
(incumbent) John W. Wilton (Ind) 1941

Beautiful Plains:
George Little (Farmer) accl.

Birtle:
(incumbent) George Malcolm (L) 995
Sam Larcombe (Farmer) 861

Brandon City:
Albert Edward Smith (Brandon Labour Party/Lab) 2007
(incumbent) Stephen Emmett Clement (L) 1403
Brig-Gen. James Kircaldy (C) 1245

Carillon:
Maurice Duprey (Farmer) 973
(incumbent) Albert Prefontaine (C) 925

Cypress:
William Spinks (C) 1487
(incumbent) Andrew W. Myles (L) 1307

Dauphin:
George Palmer (Lab) 1466
(incumbent) William J. Harrington (L) 1044

Deloraine:
(incumbent) Robert Stirton Thornton (L) 1503
J.C.W. Reid (C) 1188

Dufferin:
(incumbent) Edward August (L) 1478
Alexander Morrison (C) 1401

Emerson:
Dmytro Yakimischak (Farmer) 989
Roy Whitman (C) 925
(incumbent) John D. Baskerville (L) 756

Ethelbert:
Nicholas Hryhorczuk (Independent Farmer) 1271
Ernest A. Marcroft (Farmer) 684
James Guiszdaski (L) 110

Fairford:
Albert Kirvan (L) 241
Gabriel Gilbert Serkan (L) 240
Oliver Calverley (Ind) 236
A.F. Carpenter (Ind) 137
J. Matheson (Ind) 121

Fisher:
Henry Mabb (Independent Farmer) 443
J.W. Arsenyth (L) 362
A.J. Gamache (L) 214

Gilbert Plains:
(incumbent) William Findlater (L) 735
R.J. Dalglish (Ind) 715

Gimli:
Gudmundur Fjelsted (Farmer) 1359
(incumbent) Taras Ferley (L) 1242

Gladstone:
(incumbent) James Armstrong (L) 1327
Wesley Lobb (Farmer) 1147

Glenwood:
William Robson (Independent Farmer) 1149
(incumbent) James Breakey (L) 1145

Hamiota:
(incumbent) John Henry McConnell (L) 1109
William Ferguson (C) 762

Iberville:
(incumbent) Arthur Boivin (Ind) accl.

Kildonan & St. Andrews:
Charles Tanner (DLP/Lab) 1184
David Morrison (L) 876
T. McConnell (Farmer) 852

Killarney:
Samuel Fletcher (Farmer) 1072
(incumbent) Samuel M. Hayden (L) 676

Lakeside:
(incumbent) Charles Duncan McPherson (L) 1104
Edwin Herbert Muir (C) 1081

Lansdowne:
(incumbent) Tobias Norris (L) 1752
Harvey Hicks (C) 914

La Verendrye:
(incumbent) Philippe Talbot (Ind) 1023
L.R. Magnum (Farmer) 709

Manitou:
John S. Ridley (C) 1185
George Compton (Farmer) 926
(incumbent) George Armstrong (L) 901

Minnedosa:
(incumbent) George Grierson (L) 1296
W.T. Bielby (Farmer) 1029

Morden and Rhineland:
John Kennedy (C) 814
Howard Winkler (L) 752

Morris:
William Clubb (Farmer) 930
Alex Ayotte (Farmer) 765
Frederick J. Last (Ind) 251

Mountain:
(incumbent) James Baird (L) 1304
Andrew Young (Farmer) 1178

Norfolk:
Reuben Waugh (C) 1090
(incumbent) John Graham (L) 873
John H. Wright (Farmer) 503

Portage la Prairie:
Fawcett Taylor (C) 1306
(incumbent) Ewan McPherson (L) 1019

Roblin:
Henry Richardson (Farmer) 991
Frederic Newton (C) 887

Rockwood:
William McKinnell (Farmer) 978
(incumbent) Arthur Lobb (L) 977
Thomas Scott (C) 638

Rupertsland:
(incumbent) John Morrison (L) accl.

Russell:
(incumbent) William W.W. Wilson (L) 1274
R.J. Brown (Farmer) 642
Albert Lannigan (Ind) 593

St. Boniface:
Joseph Bernier (Ind-C) 1434
John Power Howden (L) 942
(incumbent) Joseph Dumas (L) 730
Christopher R. Rice (Ind) 675
Tony Hoornaert (Ind) 404

St. Clements:
Matthew Stanbridge (Lab) 977
(incumbent) Donald A. Ross (L-Ind) 850
H. McLennan (Farmer) 445

St. George:
Albert Kristjansson (Lab) 901
(incumbent) Skuli Sigfusson (L) 784

Ste. Rose:
(incumbent) Joseph Hamelin (C) 878
D.J. Hill (Ind) 745
Z.H. Rheaume (L) 488

Springfield:
Arthur Moore (Lab) 987
Isaac Cook (Farmer) 928
E.D.R. Bissett (L) 352
E.H. Dugard (Farmer) 123

Swan River:
Robert Emmond (People's Independent Party/Farmer) 1163
(incumbent) William H. Sims (L) 544

The Pas:
(incumbent) Edward Brown (L) 560
Allan Norgrove (Lab) 126

Turtle Mountain:
(incumbent) George William McDonald (L) 1022
Richard G. Willis (C) 1006

Virden:
(incumbent) George Clingan (L) 1313
Reginald Arthur Knight (Farmer) 1022

Winnipeg election results
Winnipeg:
Single Transferable Voting was used to elect the ten Winnipeg MLAs in one city-wide district.

Final Winnipeg seat tally: Liberal 4, DLP 2, Conservative 2, SDP 1, SPC 1.

Election was not by party list. 
The successful candidates were chosen individually by the voters: 
Liberals: Thomas Johnson, John Stovel, Duncan Cameron, Edith Rogers 
Dominion Labour Party: Fred Dixon, William Ivens 
Conservatives: John Thomas Haig, William J. Tupper 
Social Democratic Party: John Queen 
Socialist Party of Canada: George Armstrong (but not Robert Russell)

All of the successful candidates except one were among the most-popular candidates in the First Count. One came from among the lower-ranking candidates to take a seat through vote transfers. Each voter casting just a single vote in a multi-member district meant mixed roughly proportional ranking of candidates from the 1st Count on. 

41 candidates ran for the ten seats. 
10 Liberals; 10 Conservatives; 4 Labour (Dominion Labour Party); 8 Independents; 4 Socialist Party of Canada (SPC); 1 Social Democratic Party (SDP); 2 Ind.-Liberals; 1 Ind.-P/Conservative; 1 Ex-Soldiers and Ex-Sailors Party of Manitoba (S&S).  
 
10-member "Labour" slate: 4 Labour (Dominion Labour Party); 4 Socialist Party of Canada (SPC); 1 Social Democratic Party (SDP); 1 Ex-Soldiers and Ex-Sailors Party of Manitoba (S&S).

At least five candidates were women (1 Conservative, 1 Liberal, 1 SPC, 2 Ind.).

Valid votes: 47,427
Quota was 4312 (This was the minimum required to win a seat, until the last count.) (Droop Quota)

First Count (Dixon and Johnson declared elected):
(incumbent) Fred Dixon (DLP/Lab) 11586  elected in 1st Count
(incumbent) Thomas Herman Johnson (L) 4386  elected in 1st Count
George Armstrong (SPC) 2767    (elected in the end)
Duncan Cameron (L) 2402     (elected in the end)
William Ivens (DLP/Lab) 1928                                     (elected in the end)
John Thomas Haig (C) 1893                                        (elected in the end)
John Stovel (L) 1743                                             (elected in the end)
Edith Rogers (L) 1541         (elected in the end)
Robert B. Russell (SPC) 1535
William J. Tupper (C) 1500                                       (elected in the end)
J. Harriet Dick (Ind) 1307
William Christie (C) 1274
John Queen (SDPC) 1253                                          (elected in the end)
(incumbent) Robert Jacob (L) 1206
D.N. Armstrong (Ind) 1174                                          
William Clarence Morden (Ind) 1150
(incumbent) William Parrish (L) 945
Leonard Warde (Ind) 845
Will Gibben (L) 792
(incumbent) Thomas Glendenning Hamilton (L) 786
N.J. Carey (Ind) 776
James Lightfoot (C) 554
Sam Cartwright (S&S) 452
Mrs. William Arthur Pritchard (SPC) 443
E. Bailey Fisher (Ind) 431
Fred W. Law (L) 368
Genevieve Lipsett Skinner (C) 359
C.H. Forrester (Ind Progressive/Conservative) 282
P.V. Torrance (C) 265
(incumbent) Robert Newton Lowery (L) 254
George Prout (Ind) 219
M. McInnes (C) 218
A. McMartin (C) 189
G.H. Lawrence (C) 135
Alice Ann Holling (Ind) 105
Fred Tipping (DLP/Lab) 95
James O. Turnbull (C) 88
Walter A. James (DLP/Lab) 56
Robert James Johns (SPC) 52
David S. Lyon (Ind. Liberal) 45
J.H. Gislason (Ind. Liberal) 28

Second Count (Transfer of Dixon's surplus; Ivens declared elected):
(incumbent) F. J. Dixon (DLP) 4312 elected
(incumbent) Thomas Johnson (L) 4386   elected
William Ivens (DLP) 5544 elected
George Armstrong (SPC) 3187
Duncan Cameron (L) 2410
John Queen (SDPC) 2104
Robert Russell (SPC) 2028
John Thomas Haig (C) 1969
John Stovel (L) 1773
Edith Rogers (L) 1566
William J. Tupper (C) 1505
J. Dick (Ind) 1440
William Christie (C) 1297
(incumbent) Robert Jacob (L) 1240
William Morden (Ind) 1231
D.N. Armstrong (Ind) 1207
(incumbent) William Parrish (L) 958
Leonard Warde (Ind) 894
Sam Cartwright (S&S) 888
W. Gibben (L) 846
N.T. Carey (Ind) 830
(incumbent) Thomas Glendenning Hamilton (L) 817
Mrs. William Arthur Pritchard (SPC) 725
James Lightfoot (C) 594
E.B. Fisher (Ind) 474
F.W. Law (L) 396
G.L. Skinner (C) 372
C.H. Forrester (Ind Prog-Con) 300
P.V. Torrance (C) 266
(incumbent) Robert Lowery (L) 264
George Prout (Ind) 252
M. McInnes (C) 223
Fred Tipping (DLP) 218
A. McMartin (C) 202
W.A. James (DLP) 146
G.H. Lawrence (C) 153
A. Holling (Ind) 128
R.J. Johns (SPC) 104
James Turnbull (C) 90
David Lyon (IL) 49
J.H. Gislason (IL) 39

Third Count (transfer of Johnson's surplus):
(incumbent) F. J. Dixon (DLP) 4312 elected
(incumbent) Thomas Johnson (L) 4312 elected
William Ivens (DLP) 5544  elected
George Armstrong (SPC) 3187
Duncan Cameron (L) 2418
John Queen (SDPC) 2104
Robert Russell (SPC) 2028
John Thomas Haig (C) 1970
John Stovel (L) 1783
Edith Rogers (L) 1572
William J. Tupper (C) 1506
J. Dick (Ind) 1441
William Christie (C) 1297
(incumbent) Robert Jacob (L) 1250
William Morden (Ind) 1232
D.N. Armstrong (Ind) 1207
(incumbent) William Parrish (L) 976
Leonard Warde (Ind) 895
Sam Cartwright (S&S) 888
W. Gibben (L) 850
N.T. Carey (Ind) 830
(incumbent) Thomas Glendenning Hamilton (L) 823
Mrs. William Arthur Pritchard (SPC) 725
James Lightfoot (C) 594
E.B. Fisher (Ind) 474
F.W. Law (L) 399
G.L. Skinner (C) 372
C.H. Forrester (Ind Prog-Con) 300
(incumbent) Robert Lowery (L) 267
P.V. Torrance (C) 266
George Prout (Ind) 253
M. McInnes (C) 223
Fred Tipping (DLP) 218
A. McMartin (C) 202
G.H. Lawrence (C) 153
W.A. James (DLP) 146
A. Holling (Ind) 128
R.J. Johns (SPC) 104
James Turnbull (C) 90
David Lyon (IL) 49
J.H. Gislason (IL) 39

Fourth Count (Transfer of Ivens's surplus):
(incumbent) F. J. Dixon (DLP) 4312   elected
(incumbent) Thomas Johnson (L) 4312   elected
William Ivens (DLP) 4312    elected
George Armstrong (SPC) 3240
John Queen (SDPC) 2478
Duncan Cameron (L) 2419
Robert Russell (SPC) 2191
John Thomas Haig (C) 1972
John Stovel (L) 1785
Edith Rogers (L) 1576
William J. Tupper (C) 1506
J. Dick (Ind) 1449
William Christie (C) 1298
(incumbent) Robert Jacob (L) 1258
William Morden (Ind) 1241
D.N. Armstrong (Ind) 1209
(incumbent) William Parrish (L) 978
Sam Cartwright (S&S) 956
Leonard Warde (Ind) 898
Mrs. William Arthur Pritchard (SPC) 888
W. Gibben (L) 852
N.T. Carey (Ind) 831
(incumbent) Thomas Glendenning Hamilton (L) 824
James Lightfoot (C) 597
E.B. Fisher (Ind) 475
F.W. Law (L) 403
G.L. Skinner (C) 373
W.A. James (DLP) 353
C.H. Forrester (Ind Prog-Con) 301
Fred Tipping (DLP) 288
(incumbent) Robert Lowery (L) 269
P.V. Torrance (C) 266
George Prout (Ind) 257
M. McInnes (C) 224
A. McMartin (C) 203
R.J. Johns (SPC) 169
G.H. Lawrence (C) 155
A. Holling (Ind) 129
James Turnbull (C) 90
David Lyon (IL) 50
J.H. Gislason (IL) 40

Fifth Count (Gislason and Lyon eliminated. Transfer of their votes to back-up preferences, where possible):
(incumbent) F. J. Dixon (DLP) 4312    elected
(incumbent) Thomas Johnson (L) 4312    elected
William Ivens (DLP) 4312    elected
George Armstrong (SPC) 3241
John Queen (SDPC) 2486
Duncan Cameron (L) 2420
Robert Russell (SPC) 2197
John Thomas Haig (C) 1975
John Stovel (L) 1785
Edith Rogers (L) 1576
William J. Tupper (C) 1507
J. Dick (Ind) 1451
William Christie (C) 1302
(incumbent) Robert Jacob (L) 1260
William Morden (Ind) 1245
D.N. Armstrong (Ind) 1210
(incumbent) William Parrish (L) 980
Sam Cartwright (S&S) 958
Leonard Warde (Ind) 899
Mrs. William Arthur Pritchard (SPC) 890
N.T. Carey (Ind) 853
W. Gibben (L) 853
(incumbent) Thomas Glendenning Hamilton (L) 824
James Lightfoot (C) 600
E.B. Fisher (Ind) 479
F.W. Law (L) 405
G.L. Skinner (C) 374
W.A. James (DLP) 357
C.H. Forrester (Ind Prog-Con) 303
Fred Tipping (DLP) 289
(incumbent) Robert Lowery (L) 269
P.V. Torrance (C) 267
George Prout (Ind) 257
M. McInnes (C) 224
A. McMartin (C) 205
R.J. Johns (SPC) 170
G.H. Lawrence (C) 156
A. Holling (Ind) 130
James Turnbull (C) 90

Sixth Count (Turnbull eliminated):
(incumbent) F. J. Dixon (DLP) 4312    elected
(incumbent) Thomas Johnson (L) 4312    elected
William Ivens (DLP) 4312    elected
George Armstrong (SPC) 3241
John Queen (SDPC) 2486
Duncan Cameron (L) 2420
Robert Russell (SPC) 2199
John Thomas Haig (C) 1990
John Stovel (L) 1785 (?)
Edith Rogers (L) 1578
William J. Tupper (C) 1522
J. Dick (Ind) 1453
William Christie (C) 1304
(incumbent) Robert Jacob (L) 1262
William Morden (Ind) 1253
D.N. Armstrong (Ind) 1213
(incumbent) William Parrish (L) 980
Sam Cartwright (S&S) 958
Leonard Warde (Ind) 903
Mrs. William Arthur Pritchard (SPC) 890
W. Gibben (L) 859
N.T. Carey (Ind) 853
(incumbent) Thomas Glendenning Hamilton (L) 824
James Lightfoot (C) 608
E.B. Fisher (Ind) 480
F.W. Law (L) 407
G.L. Skinner (C) 378(?)
W.A. James (DLP) 358
C.H. Forrester (Ind Prog-Con) 305
Fred Tipping (DLP) 292
(incumbent) Robert Lowery (L) 269
P.V. Torrance (C) 269
George Prout (Ind) 257
M. McInnes (C) 229
A. McMartin (C) 205
R.J. Johns (SPC) 170
G.H. Lawrence (C) 157
A. Holling (Ind) 131

Seventh Count (Holling eliminated):
(incumbent) F. J. Dixon (DLP) 4312    elected
(incumbent) Thomas Johnson (L) 4312   elected
William Ivens (DLP) 4312    elected
George Armstrong (SPC) 3241
John Queen (SDPC) 2488
Duncan Cameron (L) 2421
Robert Russell (SPC) 2201
John Thomas Haig (C) 1999
John Stovel (L) 1792
Edith Rogers (L) 1588
William J. Tupper (C) 1522
J. Dick (Ind) 1479
William Christie (C) 1305
(incumbent) Robert Jacob (L) 1266
William Morden (Ind) 1257
D.N. Armstrong (Ind) 1219
(incumbent) William Parrish (L) 984
Sam Cartwright (S&S) 959
Leonard Warde (Ind) 906
Mrs. William Arthur Pritchard (SPC) 893
W. Gibben (L) 859  (?) error in original
N.T. Carey (Ind) 853
(incumbent) Thomas Glendenning Hamilton (L) 825
James Lightfoot (C) 611
E.B. Fisher (Ind) 480
F.W. Law (L) 412
G.L. Skinner (C) 392
W.A. James (DLP) 362
C.H. Forrester (Ind Prog-Con) 308
Fred Tipping (DLP) 295
(incumbent) Robert Lowery (L) 273
P.V. Torrance (C) 269
George Prout (Ind) 258
M. McInnes (C) 229
A. McMartin (C) 205
R.J. Johns (SPC) 172
G.H. Lawrence (C) 159

Eighth Count (Lawrence eliminated):
(incumbent) F. J. Dixon (DLP) 4312   elected
(incumbent) Thomas Johnson (L) 4312   elected
William Ivens (DLP) 4312    elected
George Armstrong (SPC) 3243
John Queen (SDPC) 2491
Duncan Cameron (L) 2422
Robert Russell (SPC) 2203
John Thomas Haig (C) 2007
John Stovel (L) 1796
Edith Rogers (L) 1589
William J. Tupper (C) 1526
J. Dick (Ind) 1481
William Christie (C) 1309
(incumbent) Robert Jacob (L) 1269
William Morden (Ind) 1260
D.N. Armstrong (Ind) 1221
(incumbent) William Parrish (L) 985
Sam Cartwright (S&S) 960
Leonard Warde (Ind) 908
Mrs. William Arthur Pritchard (SPC) 895
W. Gibben (L) 865
N.T. Carey (Ind) 854
(incumbent) Thomas Glendenning Hamilton (L) 826
James Lightfoot (C) 628
E.B. Fisher (Ind) 480
F.W. Law (L) 413
G.L. Skinner (C) 394
W.A. James (DLP) 363
C.H. Forrester (Ind Prog-Con) 308
Fred Tipping (DLP) 295
A. McMartin (C) 281
(incumbent) Robert Lowery (L) 275
P.V. Torrance (C) 269
George Prout (Ind) 259
M. McInnes (C) 230
R.J. Johns (SPC) 173

Ninth Count (Johns eliminated. Transfer of votes to back-up preferences):
(incumbent) F. J. Dixon (DLP) 4312    elected
(incumbent) Thomas Johnson (L) 4312   elected
William Ivens (DLP) 4312    elected
George Armstrong (SPC) 3263
John Queen (SDPC) 2508
Duncan Cameron (L) 2423
Robert Russell (SPC) 2227
John Thomas Haig (C) 2007
John Stovel (L) 1797
Edith Rogers (L) 1589
William J. Tupper (C) 1527
J. Dick (Ind) 1485
William Christie (C) 1309
(incumbent) Robert Jacob (L) 1272
William Morden (Ind) 1261
D.N. Armstrong (Ind) 1221
(incumbent) William Parrish (L) 987
Sam Cartwright (S&S) 967
Mrs. William Arthur Pritchard (SPC) 948
Leonard Warde (Ind) 909
W. Gibben (L) 865
N.T. Carey (Ind) 854
(incumbent) Thomas Glendenning Hamilton (L) 828
James Lightfoot (C) 632
E.B. Fisher (Ind) 480
F.W. Law (L) 416
G.L. Skinner (C) 394
W.A. James (DLP) 381
C.H. Forrester (Ind Prog-Con) 308
Fred Tipping (DLP) 299
A. McMartin (C) 282
(incumbent) Robert Lowery (L) 277
P.V. Torrance (C) 269
George Prout (Ind) 261
M. McInnes (C) 230

Tenth Count (McInnes eliminated):
(incumbent) F. J. Dixon (DLP) 4312   elected
(incumbent) Thomas Johnson (L) 4312   elected
William Ivens (DLP) 4312    elected
George Armstrong (SPC) 3265
John Queen (SDPC) 2508
Duncan Cameron (L) 2428
Robert Russell (SPC) 2229
John Thomas Haig (C) 2048
John Stovel (L) 1804
Edith Rogers (L) 1593
William J. Tupper (C) 1535
J. Dick (Ind) 1497
William Christie (C) 1323
(incumbent) Robert Jacob (L) 1280
William Morden (Ind) 1269
D.N. Armstrong (Ind) 1225
(incumbent) William Parrish (L) 992
Sam Cartwright (S&S) 968
Mrs. William Arthur Pritchard (SPC) 948
Leonard Warde (Ind) 918
W. Gibben (L) 868
N.T. Carey (Ind) 854
(incumbent) Thomas Glendenning Hamilton (L) 828
James Lightfoot (C) 643
E.B. Fisher (Ind) 482
F.W. Law (L) 418
G.L. Skinner (C) 405
W.A. James (DLP) 385
A. McMartin (C) 326
C.H. Forrester (Ind Prog-Con) 309
Fred Tipping (DLP) 300
(incumbent) Robert Lowery (L) 282
P.V. Torrance (C) 281
George Prout (Ind) 261

Eleventh Count (Prout eliminated. Votes transferred to back-up preferences):
(incumbent) F. J. Dixon (DLP) 4312   elected
(incumbent) Thomas Johnson (L) 4312   elected
William Ivens (DLP) 4312    elected
George Armstrong (SPC) 3270
John Queen (SDPC) 2517
Duncan Cameron (L) 2442
Robert Russell (SPC) 2236
John Thomas Haig (C) 2063
John Stovel (L) 1832
Edith Rogers (L) 1602
William J. Tupper (C) 1546
J. Dick (Ind) 1515
William Christie (C) 1326
(incumbent) Robert Jacob (L) 1295
William Morden (Ind) 1289
D.N. Armstrong (Ind) 1236
(incumbent) William Parrish (L) 1000
Sam Cartwright (S&S) 971
Mrs. William Arthur Pritchard (SPC) 950
Leonard Warde (Ind) 931
W. Gibben (L) 874
N.T. Carey (Ind) 857
(incumbent) Thomas Glendenning Hamilton (L) 834
James Lightfoot (C) 648
E.B. Fisher (Ind) 495
F.W. Law (L) 422
G.L. Skinner (C) 415
W.A. James (DLP) 386
A. McMartin (C) 330
C.H. Forrester (Ind Prog-Con) 309
Fred Tipping (DLP) 309
(incumbent) Robert Lowery (L) 284
P.V. Torrance (C) 282

Twelfth Count (Torrance eliminated):
(incumbent) F. J. Dixon (DLP) 4312   elected
(incumbent) Thomas Johnson (L) 4312   elected
William Ivens (DLP) 4312    elected
George Armstrong (SPC) 3271
John Queen (SDPC) 2517
Duncan Cameron (L) 2452
Robert Russell (SPC) 2236
John Thomas Haig (C) 2087
John Stovel (L) 1839
William J. Tupper (C) 1648
Edith Rogers (L) 1622
J. Dick (Ind) 1517
William Christie (C) 1344
(incumbent) Robert Jacob (L) 1307
William Morden (Ind) 1294
D.N. Armstrong (Ind) 1242
(incumbent) William Parrish (L) 1006
Sam Cartwright (S&S) 972
Mrs. William Arthur Pritchard (SPC) 950
Leonard Warde (Ind) 945
W. Gibben (L) 876
N.T. Carey (Ind) 857
(incumbent) Thomas Glendenning Hamilton (L) 835
James Lightfoot (C) 670
E.B. Fisher (Ind) 495
F.W. Law (L) 428
G.L. Skinner (C) 425
W.A. James (DLP) 386
A. McMartin (C) 336
Fred Tipping (DLP) 311
C.H. Forrester (Ind Prog-Con) 309
(incumbent) Robert Lowery (L) 284

Thirteenth Count (Lowery eliminated):
(incumbent) F. J. Dixon (DLP) 4312   elected
(incumbent) Thomas Johnson (L) 4312   elected
William Ivens (DLP) 4312    elected
George Armstrong (SPC) 3272
John Queen (SDPC) 2519
Duncan Cameron (L) 2469
Robert Russell (SPC) 2236
John Thomas Haig (C) 2090
John Stovel (L) 1874
William J. Tupper (C) 1656
Edith Rogers (L) 1643
J. Dick (Ind) 1524
(incumbent) Robert Jacob (L) 1380
William Christie (C) 1344
William Morden (Ind) 1300
D.N. Armstrong (Ind) 1243
(incumbent) William Parrish (L) 1035
Sam Cartwright (S&S) 972
Leonard Warde (Ind) 959
Mrs. William Arthur Pritchard (SPC) 953
W. Gibben (L) 897
(incumbent) Thomas Glendenning Hamilton (L) 858
N.T. Carey (Ind) 857
James Lightfoot (C) 671
E.B. Fisher (Ind) 497
F.W. Law (L) 444
G.L. Skinner (C) 426
W.A. James (DLP) 386
A. McMartin (C) 338
Fred Tipping (DLP) 311
C.H. Forrester (Ind Prog-Con) 309

Fourteenth Count (Forrester eliminated):
(incumbent) F. J. Dixon (DLP) 4312   elected
(incumbent) Thomas Johnson (L) 4312   elected
William Ivens (DLP) 4312    elected
George Armstrong (SPC) 3279
John Queen (SDPC) 2525
Duncan Cameron (L) 2470
Robert Russell (SPC) 2238
John Thomas Haig (C) 2107
John Stovel (L) 1876
William J. Tupper (C) 1666
Edith Rogers (L) 1649
J. Dick (Ind) 1525
(incumbent) Robert Jacob (L) 1384
William Christie (C) 1361
William Morden (Ind) 1325
D.N. Armstrong (Ind) 1250
(incumbent) William Parrish (L) 1036
Sam Cartwright (S&S) 977
Leonard Warde (Ind) 962
Mrs. William Arthur Pritchard (SPC) 954
W. Gibben (L) 904
N.T. Carey (Ind) 894
(incumbent) Thomas Glendenning Hamilton (L) 868
James Lightfoot (C) 680
E.B. Fisher (Ind) 501
F.W. Law (L) 446
G.L. Skinner (C) 430
W.A. James (DLP) 392
A. McMartin (C) 342
Fred Tipping (DLP) 313

Fifteenth Count (Tipping eliminated. Votes transferred to back-up preferences):
(incumbent) F. J. Dixon (DLP) 4312   elected
(incumbent) Thomas Johnson (L) 4312   elected
William Ivens (DLP) 4312    elected
George Armstrong (SPC) 3291
John Queen (SDPC) 2574
Duncan Cameron (L) 2470
Robert Russell (SPC) 2301
John Thomas Haig (C) 2109
John Stovel (L) 1879
William J. Tupper (C) 1672
Edith Rogers (L) 1652
J. Dick (Ind) 1537
(incumbent) Robert Jacob (L) 1387
William Christie (C) 1363
William Morden (Ind) 1327
D.N. Armstrong (Ind) 1251
(incumbent) William Parrish (L) 1037
Sam Cartwright (S&S) 1009
Mrs. William Arthur Pritchard (SPC) 973
Leonard Warde (Ind) 970
W. Gibben (L) 907
N.T. Carey (Ind) 894
(incumbent) Thomas Glendenning Hamilton (L) 868(?)
James Lightfoot (C) 680
E.B. Fisher (Ind) 501
W.A. James (DLP) 469
F.W. Law (L) 447
G.L. Skinner (C) 432
A. McMartin (C) 342

Sixteenth Count (McMartin eliminated):
(incumbent) F. J. Dixon (DLP) 4312   elected
(incumbent) Thomas Johnson (L) 4312   elected
William Ivens (DLP) 4312    elected
George Armstrong (SPC) 3295
John Queen (SDPC) 2592
Duncan Cameron (L) 2476
Robert Russell (SPC) 2303
John Thomas Haig (C) 2158
John Stovel (L) 1882
William J. Tupper (C) 1700
Edith Rogers (L) 1659
J. Dick (Ind) 1552
William Christie (C) 1390(?)
(incumbent) Robert Jacob (L) 1390
William Morden (Ind) 1370
D.N. Armstrong (Ind) 1259
(incumbent) William Parrish (L) 1043
Sam Cartwright (S&S) 1014
N.T. Carey (Ind) 1000
Mrs. William Arthur Pritchard (SPC) 979
Leonard Warde (Ind) 973
W. Gibben (L) 909
(incumbent) Thomas Glendenning Hamilton (L) 871
James Lightfoot (C) 721
E.B. Fisher (Ind) 503
W.A. James (DLP) 472
G.L. Skinner (C) 454
F.W. Law (L) 450

Seventeenth Count (Law eliminated):
(incumbent) F. J. Dixon (DLP) 4312   elected
(incumbent) Thomas Johnson (L) 4312   elected
William Ivens (DLP) 4312    elected
George Armstrong (SPC) 3297
John Queen (SDPC) 2600
Duncan Cameron (L) 2513
Robert Russell (SPC) 2308
John Thomas Haig (C) 2172
John Stovel (L) 1929
Edith Rogers (L) 1705
William J. Tupper (C) 1704
J. Dick (Ind) 1573
(incumbent) Robert Jacob (L) 1437
William Christie (C) 1392
William Morden (Ind) 1384
D.N. Armstrong (Ind) 1272
(incumbent) William Parrish (L) 1064
Leonard Warde (Ind) 1022
Sam Cartwright (S&S) 1021
N.T. Carey (Ind) 1000
Mrs. William Arthur Pritchard (SPC) 984
W. Gibben (L) 928
(incumbent) Thomas Glendenning Hamilton (L) 896
James Lightfoot (C) 765
E.B. Fisher (Ind) 504
W.A. James (DLP) 474
G.L. Skinner (C) 461

Eighteenth Count (Skinner eliminated):
(incumbent) F. J. Dixon (DLP) 4312   elected
(incumbent) Thomas Johnson (L) 4312   elected
William Ivens (DLP) 4312    elected
George Armstrong (SPC) 3300
John Queen (SDPC) 2603
Duncan Cameron (L) 2518
Robert Russell (SPC) 2311
John Thomas Haig (C) 2220
John Stovel (L) 1950
William J. Tupper (C) 1776
Edith Rogers (L) 1749
J. Dick (Ind) 1673
(incumbent) Robert Jacob (L) 1440
William Christie (C) 1427
William Morden (Ind) 1388
D.N. Armstrong (Ind) 1283
(incumbent) William Parrish (L) 1069
Leonard Warde (Ind) 1033
Sam Cartwright (S&S) 1024
N.T. Carey (Ind) 1002
Mrs. William Arthur Pritchard (SPC) 987
W. Gibben (L) 934
(incumbent) Thomas Glendenning Hamilton (L) 906
James Lightfoot (C) 809
E.B. Fisher (Ind) 508
W.A. James (DLP) 475

Nineteenth Count (James eliminated. Votes transferred to back-up preferences):
(incumbent) F. J. Dixon (DLP) 4312   elected
(incumbent) Thomas Johnson (L) 4312   elected
William Ivens (DLP) 4312    elected
George Armstrong (SPC) 3326
John Queen (SDPC) 2720
Duncan Cameron (L) 2518
Robert Russell (SPC) 2363
John Thomas Haig (C) 2233
John Stovel (L) 1953
William J. Tupper (C) 1777
Edith Rogers (L) 1752
J. Dick (Ind) 1685
(incumbent) Robert Jacob (L) 1442
William Christie (C) 1428
William Morden (Ind) 1395
D.N. Armstrong (Ind) 1286
Sam Cartwright (S&S) 1133
Mrs. William Arthur Pritchard (SPC) 1091
(incumbent) William Parrish (L) 1073
Leonard Warde (Ind) 1036
N.T. Carey (Ind) 1004
W. Gibben (L) 936
(incumbent) Thomas Glendenning Hamilton (L) 906
James Lightfoot (C) 818
E.B. Fisher (Ind) 508

Twentieth Count (Fisher eliminated):
(incumbent) F. J. Dixon (DLP) 4312   elected
(incumbent) Thomas Johnson (L) 4312   elected
William Ivens (DLP) 4312    elected
George Armstrong (SPC) 3335
John Queen (SDPC) 2729
Duncan Cameron (L) 2545
Robert Russell (SPC) 2367
John Thomas Haig (C) 2297
John Stovel (L) 1987
William J. Tupper (C) 1799
Edith Rogers (L) 1769
J. Dick (Ind) 1744
(incumbent) Robert Jacob (L) 1465
William Christie (C) 1456
William Morden (Ind) 1430
D.N. Armstrong (Ind) 1315
Sam Cartwright (S&S) 1144
Mrs. William Arthur Pritchard (SPC) 1099
(incumbent) William Parrish (L) 1095
Leonard Warde (Ind) 1059
N.T. Carey (Ind) 1014
W. Gibben (L) 961
(incumbent) Thomas Glendenning Hamilton (L) 918
James Lightfoot (C) 842

Twenty-First Count (Lightfoot eliminated):
(incumbent) F. J. Dixon (DLP) 4312   elected
(incumbent) Thomas Johnson (L) 4312   elected
William Ivens (DLP) 4312    elected
George Armstrong (SPC) 3349
John Queen (SDPC) 2743
Duncan Cameron (L) 2565
John Thomas Haig (C) 2442
Robert Russell (SPC) 2376
John Stovel (L) 2025
William J. Tupper (C) 1938
Edith Rogers (L) 1807
J. Dick (Ind) 1769
William Christie (C) 1548
William Morden (Ind) 1512
(incumbent) Robert Jacob (L) 1479
D.N. Armstrong (Ind) 1367
Sam Cartwright (S&S) 1157
Mrs. William Arthur Pritchard (SPC) 1119
(incumbent) William Parrish (L) 1116
Leonard Warde (Ind) 1102
N.T. Carey (Ind) 1018
W. Gibben (L) 972
(incumbent) Thomas Glendenning Hamilton (L) 934

Twenty-Second Count (Hamilton eliminated):
(incumbent) F. J. Dixon (DLP) 4312   elected
(incumbent) Thomas Johnson (L) 4312   elected
William Ivens (DLP) 4312    elected
George Armstrong (SPC) 3356
John Queen (SDPC) 2757
Duncan Cameron (L) 2721
John Thomas Haig (C) 2475
Robert Russell (SPC) 2380
John Stovel (L) 2147
William J. Tupper (C) 1950
Edith Rogers (L) 1923
J. Dick (Ind) 1816
(incumbent) Robert Jacob (L) 1629
William Christie (C) 1558
William Morden (Ind) 1525
D.N. Armstrong (Ind) 1381
(incumbent) William Parrish (L) 1219
Sam Cartwright (S&S) 1162
Mrs. William Arthur Pritchard (SPC) 1124
Leonard Warde (Ind) 1117
W. Gibben (L) 1059
N.T. Carey (Ind) 1019

Twenty-Third Count (Carey eliminated):
(incumbent) F. J. Dixon (DLP) 4312   elected
(incumbent) Thomas Johnson (L) 4312   elected
William Ivens (DLP) 4312    elected
George Armstrong (SPC) 3380
John Queen (SDPC) 2840
Duncan Cameron (L) 2752
John Thomas Haig (C) 2562
Robert Russell (SPC) 2398
John Stovel (L) 2173
William J. Tupper (C) 2043
Edith Rogers (L) 1947
J. Dick (Ind) 1910
William Christie (C) 1650
(incumbent) Robert Jacob (L) 1648
William Morden (Ind) 1645
D.N. Armstrong (Ind) 1405
(incumbent) William Parrish (L) 1260
Sam Cartwright (S&S) 1212
Leonard Warde (Ind) 1163
Mrs. William Arthur Pritchard (SPC) 1147
W. Gibben (L) 1067

Twenty-Fourth Count (Gibben eliminated):
(incumbent) F. J. Dixon (DLP) 4312   elected
(incumbent) Thomas Johnson (L) 4312   elected
William Ivens (DLP) 4312    elected
George Armstrong (SPC) 3390
Duncan Cameron (L) 2970
John Queen (SDPC) 2851
John Thomas Haig (C) 2621
Robert Russell (SPC) 2405
John Stovel (L) 2332
Edith Rogers (L) 2073
William J. Tupper (C) 2057
J. Dick (Ind) 1991
(incumbent) Robert Jacob (L) 1804
William Morden (Ind) 1660
William Christie (C) 1659
D.N. Armstrong (Ind) 1420
(incumbent) William Parrish (L) 1382
Sam Cartwright (S&S) 1223
Leonard Warde (Ind) 1188
Mrs. William Arthur Pritchard (SPC) 1155

Twenty-Fifth Count (Mrs. William Arthur Pritchard eliminated):
(incumbent) F. J. Dixon (DLP) 4312   elected
(incumbent) Thomas Johnson (L) 4312   elected
William Ivens (DLP) 4312    elected
George Armstrong (SPC) 3459
John Queen (SDPC) 3391
Duncan Cameron (L) 2973
Robert Russell (SPC) 2820
John Thomas Haig (C) 2626
John Stovel (L) 2337
Edith Rogers (L) 2080
William J. Tupper (C) 2060
J. Dick (Ind) 2005
(incumbent) Robert Jacob (L) 1809
William Morden (Ind) 1667
William Christie (C) 1660
D.N. Armstrong (Ind) 1426
(incumbent) William Parrish (L) 1383
Sam Cartwright (S&S) 1278
Leonard Warde (Ind) 1201

Twenty-Sixth Count (Warde eliminated):
(incumbent) F. J. Dixon (DLP) 4312   elected
(incumbent) Thomas Johnson (L) 4312   elected
William Ivens (DLP) 4312    elected
George Armstrong (SPC) 3493
John Queen (SDPC) 3431
Duncan Cameron (L) 3021
Robert Russell (SPC) 2852
John Thomas Haig (C) 2695
John Stovel (L) 2430
Edith Rogers (L) 2154
William J. Tupper (C) 2115
J. Dick (Ind) 2086
(incumbent) Robert Jacob (L) 1875
William Morden (Ind) 1754
D.N. Armstrong (Ind) 1729
William Christie (C) 1682
(incumbent) William Parrish (L) 1419
Sam Cartwright (S&S) 1384

Twenty-Seventh Count (Cartwright eliminated):
(incumbent) F. J. Dixon (DLP) 4312   elected
(incumbent) Thomas Johnson (L) 4312   elected
William Ivens (DLP) 4312    elected
John Queen (SDPC) 3870
George Armstrong (SPC) 3856
Duncan Cameron (L) 3030
Robert Russell (SPC) 3030
John Thomas Haig (C) 2726
John Stovel (L) 2454
Edith Rogers (L) 2177
J. Dick (Ind) 2170
William J. Tupper (C) 2125
(incumbent) Robert Jacob (L) 1897
D.N. Armstrong (Ind) 1805
William Morden (Ind) 1798
William Christie (C) 1705
(incumbent) William Parrish (L) 1424

Twenty-Eighth Count (Parrish eliminated):
(incumbent) F. J. Dixon (DLP) 4312   elected
(incumbent) Thomas Johnson (L) 4312   elected
William Ivens (DLP) 4312    elected
John Queen (SDPC) 3887
George Armstrong (SPC) 3859
Duncan Cameron (L) 3280
Robert Russell (SPC) 3040
John Stovel (L) 2961
John Thomas Haig (C) 2778
Edith Rogers (L) 2389
J. Dick (Ind) 2213
William J. Tupper (C) 2163
(incumbent) Robert Jacob (L) 2119
D.N. Armstrong (Ind) 1820
William Morden (Ind) 1811
William Christie (C) 1726

(13 candidates remaining, seven seats still open)

Twenty-Ninth Count (Christie eliminated):
(incumbent) F. J. Dixon (DLP) 4312   elected
(incumbent) Thomas Johnson (L) 4312   elected
William Ivens (DLP) 4312    elected
John Queen (SDPC) 3907
George Armstrong (SPC) 3869
John Thomas Haig (C) 3794
Duncan Cameron (L) 3312
Robert Russell (SPC) 3043
John Stovel (L) 3011
William J. Tupper (C) 2501
Edith Rogers (L) 2423
J. Dick (Ind) 2288
(incumbent) Robert Jacob (L) 2148
William Morden (Ind) 1869
D.N. Armstrong (Ind) 1844

Thirtieth Count (D.A. Armstrong eliminated)
(incumbent) F. J. Dixon (DLP) 4312   elected
(incumbent) Thomas Johnson (L) 4312   elected
William Ivens (DLP) 4312    elected
John Queen (SDPC) 4087
John Thomas Haig (C) 4020
George Armstrong (SPC) 4006
Duncan Cameron (L) 3461
John Stovel (L) 3138
Robert Russell (SPC) 3114
William J. Tupper (C) 2598
Edith Rogers (L) 2570
J. Dick (Ind) 2558
(incumbent) Robert Jacob (L) 2223 (error in numbers)
William Morden (Ind) ?

(11 candidates remaining, seven seats still open)

Thirty-First Count (Morden eliminated; Haig declared elected):
(incumbent) F. J. Dixon (DLP) 4312   elected
(incumbent) Thomas Johnson (L) 4312   elected
William Ivens (DLP) 4312    elected
John Thomas Haig (C) 4416   elected
John Queen (SDPC) 4274
George Armstrong (SPC) 4090
Duncan Cameron (L) 3562
John Stovel (L) 3331
Robert Russell (SPC) 3206
J. Dick (Ind) 2743
William J. Tupper (C) 2922
Edith Rogers (L) 2694
(incumbent) Robert Jacob (L) ?

(9 candidates remaining, six seats still open)

Thirty-Second Count (Jacob eliminated; Queen declared elected):
(incumbent) F. J. Dixon (DLP) 4312   elected
(incumbent) Thomas Johnson (L) 4312   elected
William Ivens (DLP) 4312    elected
John Thomas Haig (C) 4416   elected [his surplus votes not transferred until 34th Count]
John Queen (SDPC) 4332    elected
Duncan Cameron (L) 4123
George Armstrong (SPC) 4103
John Stovel (L) 4095
Robert Russell (SPC) 3226
Edith Rogers (L) 3189
William J. Tupper (C) 3069
J. Dick (Ind) 2934
(although Queen was the only SDP candidate and did not initially have quota, he received many vote transfers and eventually exceeded quota and took a seat. These were all votes transferred across party lines.)

(7 candidates remaining, five seats still open)

(Numbers for the 33rd count not listed.  Dick eliminated.  Stovel elected with 4674 votes; Cameron elected with 4394 votes.)

(4 candidates remaining, 3 seats still open)
After the necessary transfer of surplus votes, if no one gets quota, the bottom candidate will be eliminated, leaving just enough candidates for the available seats.

Thirty-Fourth Count (transfer of Haig's surplus):
(incumbent) F. J. Dixon (DLP) 4312   elected
(incumbent) Thomas Johnson (L) 4312   elected
William Ivens (DLP) 4312    elected
John Thomas Haig (C) 4312   elected
John Queen (SDPC) 4332   elected
John Stovel (L) 4674   elected
Duncan Cameron (L) 4394     elected
George Armstrong (SPC) 4245
Edith Rogers (L) 3801
William J. Tupper (C) 3488
Robert Russell (SPC) 3487

Thirty-Fifth Count (transfer of Queen's surplus):
(incumbent) F. J. Dixon (DLP) 4312   elected
(incumbent) Thomas Johnson (L) 4312   elected
William Ivens (DLP) 4312    elected
John Thomas Haig (C) 4312   elected
John Queen (SDPC) 4312   elected
John Stovel (L) 4674   elected
Duncan Cameron (L) 4394   elected
George Armstrong (SPC) 4245
Edith Rogers (L) 3805
Robert Russell (SPC) 3503
William J. Tupper (C) 3488

Thirty-Sixth Count (transfer of Stovel's surplus):
(incumbent) F. J. Dixon (DLP) 4312   elected
(incumbent) Thomas Johnson (L) 4312   elected
William Ivens (DLP) 4312    elected
John Thomas Haig (C) 4312   elected
John Queen (SDPC) 4312   elected
John Stovel (L) 4312   elected
Duncan Cameron (L) 4394   elected
George Armstrong (SPC) 4258
Edith Rogers (L) 3947
Robert Russell (SPC) 3519
William J. Tupper (C) 3519

(4 candidates remaining, 3 seats still open)
Thirty-Seventh Count (Cameron's surplus transferred - no change in order of candidates)
(incumbent) Fred Dixon (DLP) 4312   elected
(incumbent) Thomas Johnson (L) 4312   elected
William Ivens (DLP) 4312    elected
John Thomas Haig (C) 4312   elected
John Queen (SDPC) 4312   elected
John Stovel (L) 4312   elected
Duncan Cameron (L) 4312   elected
George Armstrong (SPC) 4282
Edith Rogers (L) 4010
William J. Tupper (C) 3582
Robert Russell (SPC) 3520
(exhausted votes at this point: 1849

Thirty-Eighth Count
Russell is eliminated, leaving only Armstrong, Rogers and Tupper to take the three open seats. They are declared elected.

Final Winnipeg seat tally: Liberal 4, DLP 2, Conservative 2, SDPC 1, SPC 1

Election was not by party list. 
The successful candidates were chosen individually by the voters:
Liberals: Thomas Johnson, John Stovel, Duncan Cameron, Edith Rogers 
Dominion Labour: Fred Dixon, William Ivens
Conservatives: John Thomas Haig, William J. Tupper
Social Democrats: John Queen
Socialists: George Armstrong (but not Robert Russell)

Sources

The first ballot results for Winnipeg and results for all other constituencies are taken from an official Manitoba government publication entitled "Manitoba elections, 1920-1941" (cross-referenced with an appendix to the government's report of the 2003 provincial election).  The Canadian Parliamentary Guide for 1921 lists slightly different results for Dufferin and Gladstone; the other two sources contain more information, however, and may be taken as more reliable.

All ballot results for Winnipeg after the first count are taken from reports in the Winnipeg Free Press newspaper.  It is possible that some errors appeared in the original publication.

Post-election changes

The Independent and Farmer members formed a parliamentary bloc after the election, known as the Independent-Farmer group.  Albert Kristjansson later left the Labour caucus to sit with this group.

Birtle (George Malcolm to cabinet, September 30, 1920), October 14, 1920:
George Malcolm (L) accl.

Lakeside (Charles Duncan McPherson to cabinet, January 20, 1921), January 31, 1921:
Charles Duncan McPherson (L) 1176
E. Herbert Muir (F) 1020

References

Further reading
 

1920 elections in Canada
1920
1920 in Manitoba
June 1920 events